Pustkowie may refer to the following places:
Pustkowie, Lubusz Voivodeship (west Poland)
Pustkowie, Gliwice County in Silesian Voivodeship (south Poland)
Pustkowie, Lubliniec County in Silesian Voivodeship (south Poland)
Pustkowie, Chojnice County in Pomeranian Voivodeship (north Poland)
Pustkowie, Starogard County in Pomeranian Voivodeship (north Poland)
Pustkowie, West Pomeranian Voivodeship (north-west Poland)